Much of the information concerning the Continental schooner Mosquito (or Musquito, or Musqueto, or Muskeito) comes from her capture and destruction in July 1777. Even the Dictionary of American Naval Fighting Ships (DANFS) has nothing about the vessel.

On 1 October 1776, the Continental Marine Committee ordered Lieutenant Thomas Albertson to sail the schooner Muskeito to North Carolina with letters, and to bring back such naval stores as he could gather. Then on 10 October the Marine Committee formally established the ranks and precedence of the commanders of vessels in the Continental Navy. Lieutenant Thomas Albertson, as commander of the smallest vessel, Musquito, of four guns, ranked 26th out of 26.

The next (implicit) mention of Mosquito occurs on 22 April 1777 when the Navy Board of the Middle Department asked to borrow 70 shot for 2-pounder guns. Thomas Albertson carried the request, which he needed for his vessel, which was almost ready for sea.

The expedition was under the command of Pearls sailing master.

The expedition returned the next day. The British captured Mosquitto, Captain Thomas Albertson, at 3 in the morning, without any opposition as the only people aboard were her master and gunner. She was armed with six 3-pounder guns and four swivel guns; the expedition burned her after taking their two prisoners off.

Citations and references

Citations

References
 
 
 

1770s ships
Schooners of the United States Navy
Ships of the Continental Navy
Vessels captured from the United States Navy